Telmatochromis brachygnathus is a species of cichlid endemic to Lake Tanganyika.  This species can reach a length of  SL.

References

brachygnathus
Fish described in 2003
Taxonomy articles created by Polbot